Tony Potts (born 1976/77) was an appointed Republican Idaho state senator. He served only one session of the Idaho legislature, filling the unexpired of term of Bart Davis, before losing in the Republican primary to Dave Lent.

Biography
Potts graduated from Brigham Young University. He is active in the local Republican party and unsuccessfully ran for Bonneville County Commission in 2016. He works as a property manager and salesman in Idaho Falls.

Following the resignation of longtime Senator Bart Davis in order to serve as United States Attorney for the District of Idaho, Potts was selected by Governor Butch Otter to fill the vacancy. He was chosen over State Representative Bryan Zollinger and Mark Fuller, chairman of the Bonneville County Republican Party.

Potts lost by a close to a two-to-one margin in the May 15th, 2018 Republican Primary to David Lent.

References

1970s births
Living people
Brigham Young University alumni
Businesspeople from Idaho
Republican Party Idaho state senators
People from Idaho Falls, Idaho
21st-century American politicians